Alasdair Taylor may refer to:

Alasdair Grant Taylor (1934-2007), Scottish artist and sculptor
Alasdair Taylor (squash player) (born 1965), Scottish squash player